The Cathedral of St. Matthew the Apostle in Washington, D.C., most commonly known as St. Matthew's Cathedral, is the seat of the Archbishop of the Roman Catholic Archdiocese of Washington. As St. Matthew's Cathedral and Rectory, it has been listed on the National Register of Historic Places since 1974.

The cathedral is in downtown Washington at 1725 Rhode Island Avenue NW between Connecticut Avenue and 17th Street. The closest Metrorail station is Farragut North, on the Red Line. It is seven blocks north and two blocks west of the White House.

History
St. Matthew's is dedicated to the Apostle Matthew, who among other things is the patron saint of civil servants, having himself been a tax collector. It was established in 1840 by pastor Father William Matthews and parochial vicar Father John Philip Donelan. The church was dedicated on November 1, 1840, though the structure had not yet been entirely completed. Originally located at 15th and H Streets, construction of the current church began in 1893, with the first Mass being celebrated June 2, 1895. Construction continued until 1913 when the church was dedicated. In 1939, it became the cathedral for the newly established Archdiocese of Washington.

Architecture
The structure is constructed of red brick with sandstone and terra cotta trim in the Romanesque Revival style with Byzantine elements. The interior is richly decorated in marble and semiprecious stones, notably a  mosaic of Matthew behind the main altar by Edwin Blashfield. Both structural and decorative elements underwent extensive restoration between 2000 and September 21, 2003, the feast day of St. Matthew.

Historic events

The first notable funeral Mass offered at St. Matthew's was for Manuel L. Quezon, the president of the Philippines, who died August 1, 1944, and was interred at Arlington National Cemetery until the end of World War II. In 1957, a Solemn Requiem Mass was offered at the cathedral for the funeral of Senator Joseph McCarthy; the liturgy was attended by 70 senators and hundreds of clergymen and it was filled to capacity.

The cathedral drew worldwide attention following the assassination of United States President John F. Kennedy on Friday, November 22, 1963, in Dallas, Texas. Richard, Cardinal Cushing, Archbishop of Boston and a Kennedy family friend, offered a recited (not sung) Pontifical Requiem Low Mass during the state funeral on Monday, November 25, 1963, which was followed by the procession to Arlington National Cemetery in Virginia for the burial. 

Other notable events at the cathedral include a Mass celebrated by Pope John Paul II during his 1979 visit to Washington, D.C., and the 1997 funeral of U.S. Supreme Court Associate Justice William J. Brennan, Jr.

The cathedral was the site of a Lutheran funeral service for Chief Justice William Rehnquist on September 7, 2005.

St. Matthew's is the location for one of the most famous Red Masses in the world. Each year on the day before the term of the Supreme Court of the United States begins, Mass is celebrated to request guidance from the Holy Spirit for the legal profession. Owing to the cathedral's location in the nation's capital, the Justices of the Supreme Court, members of Congress and the Cabinet, and many other dignitaries (including, at times, the President of the United States) attend the Mass. Dwight Eisenhower became the first to attend as president in 1954; Harry Truman attended nine years earlier, but as vice president.

In 2020, the cathedral hosted its first archdiocesan Easter Mass since the larger Basilica of the National Shrine of the Immaculate Conception was dedicated in 1959. The Mass, televised and livestreamed by EWTN, was celebrated by archbishop Wilton Gregory with no members of the faithful present, because of COVID-19 restrictions.

Prior to the inauguration of Joe Biden as the 46th President of the United States he, along with Senate Majority Leader Mitch McConnell, Senate Minority Leader Chuck Schumer, Speaker of the United States House of Representatives Nancy Pelosi and House Minority Leader Kevin McCarthy attended Mass at the church.

Crypt
Near the entry of the St. Francis Chapel is a burial crypt with eight tombs intended for Washington's archbishops. Three former archbishops, Patrick Cardinal O’Boyle,  William Cardinal Baum, and James Cardinal Hickey, are interred here.

See also
List of Catholic cathedrals in the United States
List of cathedrals in the United States

References

Further reading
 Philibert, Helene, Philibert, Estelle, Philibert, Imogene (1940). Saint Matthew's of Washington. Baltimore, MD: A. Hoen & Co.

External links

 Official Cathedral Site
 Roman Catholic Archdiocese of Washington Official Site
 Marble plaque in front of the sanctuary gates commemorates President John F. Kennedy's funeral Mass
 Cathedral of St Matthew the Apostle: Photo Gallery by The Catholic Photographer

Roman Catholic churches completed in 1913
Churches on the National Register of Historic Places in Washington, D.C.
Dupont Circle
Individually listed contributing properties to historic districts on the National Register in Washington, D.C.
Byzantine Revival architecture in Washington, D.C.
Religious organizations established in 1840
Matthew the Apostle
Roman Catholic churches in Washington, D.C.
Romanesque Revival church buildings in Washington, D.C.
Renaissance Revival architecture in Washington, D.C.
Heins and LaFarge buildings
1840 establishments in Washington, D.C.
Church buildings with domes
Cathedrals in Washington, D.C.
Presidential churches in the United States
20th-century Roman Catholic church buildings in the United States